Cissura plumbea is a moth of the family Erebidae first described by George Hampson in 1901. It is found in Honduras, Belize, Peru and Bolivia.

Subspecies
Cissura plumbea plumbea (Belize)
Cissura plumbea excelsior Rothschild, 1933 (Peru)

References

Phaegopterina
Moths described in 1901